The South East London Green Chain, also known as the Green Chain Walk, is a linked system of open spaces between the River Thames and Crystal Palace Park in London, England. In 1977 four London boroughs and the Greater London Council created this Green Chain of 300 open spaces to protect them from building activity. The four London boroughs are Bexley, Bromley, Lewisham and Greenwich.  More recently it has been extended to include sections in Southwark. Many parts of the system are also part of the Capital Ring route.

The system begins at three places on the River Thames: Thames Barrier, Thamesmead, and the riverside at Erith. There are various circular walks along the route, and there is an offshoot from the main route to Chislehurst; and the next section reaches Crystal Palace via Bromley.
From there it goes north with branches to Dulwich and Nunhead.

The major open spaces in the Chain are:
 Lesnes Abbey
 Bostall Heath and Woods
 Parks in Charlton including Maryon Park, Maryon Wilson Park and Charlton Park
 Woolwich Common
 Plumstead Common
 Shooters Hill area, including Shrewsbury Park, Eaglesfield Park, Oxleas Wood and several other woods and open spaces
 Eltham Park and Common
 Eltham Palace
 Avery Hill Park
 Grove Park Nature Reserve
 Chinbrook Meadows
 Elmstead Wood
 Parks around Beckenham, including Beckenham Place Park
 Parks around Bromley including Sundridge Park and Chislehurst Common
 Crystal Palace Park

The complete list and the routes are to be found on TfL's Walk London site.

See also
 Greenway (landscape)
 Linear Park
 Trail
 Walking in London

References

External links
Official TfL site
Review of Green Chain
Route on OpenStreetMap, select your walk (takes time to load).
The Green Chain Walk on the Go Jauntly app, in partnership with Transport for London.

Walking in London
Parks and open spaces in London
Long-distance footpaths in England
Footpaths in London

Sydenham Wells Park ( Borough of Lewisham) is in the Green chain walk. It is one of the most attractive parks in the borough with a fine water feature, ponds, water play, flowerbeds and fine species of trees and shrubs.
It is on route from Crystal Palace to Sydenham Hill Woods with a Noticeboard and well signed markings...